Papanasam is a town in Thanjavur district in the Indian state of Tamil Nadu. It may also refer to:

Film
 Papanasam (film), a Tamil film featuring Kamal Haasan

Places
 Papanasam taluk, a taluk in Thanjavur district in the Indian state of Tamil Nadu
 Papanasam block, a revenue block in the Papanasam taluk of Thanjavur district in the Indian state of Tamil Nadu
 Papanasam (State Assembly Constituency), a state assembly constituency in the Indian state of Tamil Nadu
 Papanasam, Tirunelveli, a famous picnic spot in Tirunelveli district in the Indian state of Tamil Nadu
 Papanasam Dam, a dam in Tirunelveli district in the Indian state of Tamil Nadu
 Varkala Beach, a beach in Varkala, in the Indian state of Kerala

People
 Papanasam Sivan (1890-1973), a prominent composer of Carnatic music and a singer